Robert Buda (born 10 February 1970) is a Polish boxer. He competed in the men's middleweight event at the 1992 Summer Olympics.

References

1970 births
Living people
Polish male boxers
Olympic boxers of Poland
Boxers at the 1992 Summer Olympics
Sportspeople from Wrocław
Middleweight boxers
21st-century Polish people
20th-century Polish people